Kersten is a German given name and a Dutch/Low German surname.

Given name
A German male or female given name
 Kersten Artus (born 1964) female German journalist and politician
 Kersten Meier (1954–2001) male German swimmer at the 1972 Summer Olympics
 Kersten Neisser (born 1956) female German rower

Surname
A Dutch and Low German patronymic surname, meaning "son of Kerst/Kersten/Kerstijn/Kerstiaen", archaic forms of the name Christian.

People with this surname include:
 Adam Kersten (1930–1983), Polish historian
 Ben Kersten (born 1981), Dutch-Australian racing cyclist
 Carool Kersten (born 1964), Dutch historian
 Charles J. Kersten (1902–1972), American politician from Wisconsin
  (1733–1796), German missionary in Suriname
 Claire Kersten (born 1989), New Zealand netball player
 Dagmar Kersten (born 1970), East German gymnast
 Felix Kersten (1898–1960), Himmler's masseur who aided people persecuted by Nazi Germany
 Frank L. Kersten (1870–1950), American politician
 Franziska Kersten (born 1968) German politician
 Gerrit Hendrik Kersten (1882–1948), Dutch politician (SGP)
 Holger Kersten (born 1951), German writer on the lost years of Jesus in India
 Ina Kersten (born 1946), German mathematician
 Joke Kersten (born 1944), Dutch politician
 Krystyna Kersten (1931–2008), Polish historian
 Mark Kersten (born 1950), Australian politician
  (1906–1999), German physicist and metallurgist
 Martin L. Kersten (born 1953), Dutch computer scientist
 Mik Kersten (born 1975), Polish-born Canadian computer scientist
 Otto Kersten (1839–1900), German explorer, chemist and geographer
 Peter Kersten (born 1958), German rower
 Ryan Kersten (born 1986), Australian basketball player

See also 
 Kerstens

Dutch-language surnames
Low German surnames
German unisex given names
Patronymic surnames